Sintaluta is a small town in Saskatchewan, Canada. The current population of Sintaluta is approximately 119 people according to the 2016 Canadian Census. The town is located about 85 km east of Regina. The town is located on the north side of the Trans-Canada Highway.

It is the administrative headquarters of the Carry the Kettle Nakoda First Nations band government.

Demographics 

History

Sintaluta is the birthplace of noted Canadian educator Sylvia Larter and the hometown of E.A. Partridge, the "Sage of Sintaluta", the first person to establish the concept of farmer-owned grain companies on the prairies, as a result of an incident known as "The Box Car Caper" that happened in 1901 at Sintaluta. In 1901, there was a bumper crop of wheat in the Sintaluta district. It was a good year all around for farmers as far as wheat was concerned, but their problem was getting the wheat on trains for delivery to the grain terminals. Farmers would bring their grain to the elevator and trains would leave without taking it. Some influential men of the time decided that they would take the Canadian Pacific Railway to court over this matter. One of these men was E.A. Partridge of Sintaluta. The farmers won the case. They had made their stand at a key time, for the CPR described Sintaluta as being the largest grain shipping point at that time, in Western Canada. This was later made into a movie by the Saskatchewan Wheat Pool and called The Long Haul.

The name Sintaluta comes from a Lakota language word meaning tail of the red fox.

Sintaluta was founded in 1907 and celebrated its 100th anniversary on August 3–5, 2007.

Before the Canadian Pacific Railway made its way across the west, the pioneers would stop at Sintaluta to refresh their supplies before heading west. The first stopping house was established in Sintaluta, NWT, in 1881 by Harry Rowe. Sintaluta's first school classroom was opened up shortly after 1882. The first church was built by the Presbyterians in 1897,followed by the Methodists in 1899 and then the Anglican Church was built the same year and is a fine stone church which still stands today and is cared and maintained by the Sintaluta History Club. It was incorporated as a town in 1907.

Sintaluta had many firsts in its time. One such incidence is the fact that Sintaluta was the original home of "Saskatchewan House". This was what the owners of the local hotel had named their business. It was known as this in the mid-1920s.

Sintaluta was home to the founder of the current-day United Grain Growers Association (Agricore United) with prominent local residents residing on the first board of directors. The Grain Growers Guide (now The Country Guide) first editor was also from Sintaluta.

Sintaluta has had the distinction of being the largest shipping point of grain in Western Canada, and continues to produce record crops more than 100 years later.

The first section foreman for the CPR came to town in 1886. The first railway station opened here in 1898. When Saskatchewan became a province in 1905, the people of the settlement soon set into action the application that this place should be incorporated into a town. This happened in the year 1907.

The town outgrew its school classroom and the first school house was a necessity and was built in 1895. In 1899 a large stone school was built. It burned down in 1905. A two-story brick school was built in 1907. The bricks were purchased locally from a factory in Lebret.

Church services were held in the stopping house and schools until 1887, when the Presbyterian built a wooden structure, followed by a brick one built by the Methodists in 1899. St. John the Baptist Anglican Church also built a stone church and manse that is still standing today and has been carefully preserved by the local history club. In 1943, St Helene's Roman Catholic church was built. This church is still present today. In 1959, the congregation of Jehovah's Witnesses built Kingdom Hall. The United Church of Canada built a modern church and education centre in the early 1960s. This is now home to the senior citizens association.

Sintaluta was home to Warden Burgess, who was the elected MLA for the constituency of Qu'Appelle-Wolseley in 1944. He remained active in the CCF/NDP party throughout his lifetime. He was also president/director  to many boards and organizations and was even president of the South Saskatchewan Baseball league and the Regina Red Sox baseball team.  Sintaluta has had a very active municipal council, and has had several long term mayors such as Bill Troughton, Ken Kraushaar, David Damm and current mayor, Keith Rathgeber.

Another first for the town was when in 1945, Bell Telephone celebrated its 70th anniversary. There was a resident in town, whose name was John Miller. He was 91 years old at the time. He received a call from Paris, Ontario, that was sent by the mayor of the city. It was congratulating him on being the oldest person from Western Canada who heard the first message sent over the Bell Telephone when he was 21 years old.

Sintaluta once was home to seven elevator companies, and has the distinction as being one of the top grain-producing areas in all of Canada. There are two remaining elevators in town today, and are in the hands of private owners, two of fewer than 350 elevators that remain across the prairies today.
Robert (Bob) Baker worked for the Saskatchewan Wheat Pool as a grain buyer from 1935 until 1952 when he was superannuated from the Sask. Wheat Pool elevator
and became Town Clerk as well as selling farm insurance.
The Sintaluta Co-op service station opened in 1947. Vic Sexsmith was the Manager from 1947 to 1965. Albert Sexsmith worked there from 1947 to 1954. It is the only service station still in operation in Sintaluta in 2017. Vic Sexsmith became Town Clerk in 1965 taking over from Robert (Bob) Baker who was Town Clerk from 1952 to 1965. Vic also took over the insurance business. 
Vic Sexsmith was a Town Councillor for several terms. He became the Mayor of Sintaluta in 1961. He remained as Town Clerk from 1965 until 1970 when he became ill and his Wife Marion Sexsmith took over and was Town Clerk until 1974. She became an insurance agent for S.G.I. and Wawanesa  until 1974.

See also
List of place names in Canada of Indigenous origin

References

Towns in Saskatchewan
Indian Head No. 156, Saskatchewan
Populated places established in 1881
1881 establishments in Canada
Division No. 6, Saskatchewan